The San Juan Children's Choir (Coro de Niños de San Juan in Spanish) is a children's choir from San Juan, Puerto Rico. The group was founded in 1966 by its director, Evy Lucío Córdova.
The Choir usually accepts participants from the age of 6 and on. Auditions are held every year. Singers who participate at this institution leave at about age of 17 or 18.

The San Juan Children's Choir has performed in many countries.
The choir performed at the second inauguration of Barack Obama.

References

External links
 Coro de Niños de San Juan website

Choirs of children
San Juan, Puerto Rico
Musical groups established in 1966
1966 establishments in Puerto Rico